The Brondings were a Germanic tribe. They and Breca the Bronding are mentioned in Beowulf (Th. 1047; B. 521.), as Beowulf's childhood friend, and in Widsith (Scóp Th. 51; Wíd. 25.), where Breca is the lord of the Brondings. They were probably the people of the Swedish island of Brännö, west of Gothenburg in the Kattegatt.

See also
 List of Germanic tribes
 Germanic peoples

Sources
An Anglo-Saxon Dictionary

Early Germanic peoples